Gyeongsun of Silla (897–978) was the 56th and final ruler of the Korean kingdom of Silla.

Biography
A sixth-generation descendant of King Munseong, he was the son of Kim Hyo-Jong by Princess Gyea, who was the daughter of King Heongang. His wife was Lady Jukbang (죽방부인) of the Juksan Park clan, his eldest son was Crown Prince Maui, and his youngest son was Beomgong.

Gyeongsun was placed on the throne by the Hubaekje king Gyeon Hwon after the Hubaekje forces sacked Gyeongju in 927. The kingdom was already in an extremely weakened state, so Gyeongsun reigned over a tiny remnant of the former Silla territory until finally abdicating in favour of Taejo of Goryeo in 935. He remarried Taejo's daughter Princess Nangrang (낙랑공주) and was appointed sasim-gwan (사심관, inspector-general) of Gyeongju, becoming the first of Goryeo's sasim-gwan system. He lived out the remainder of his life near the Goryeo capital (modern-day Kaesong).

He died in 978 and his tomb lies in Jangnam-myeon, Yeoncheon County, Gyeonggi-do, South Korea.

According to Samguk Sagi, Gyeongsun's son, Crown Prince Maui objected to his father's submission to Goryeo and became a hermit in Mount Kumgang.

Family

Father: Kim Hyo-Jong, King Shinheung of Silla (신흥대왕)
Grandfather: King Uiheung of Silla (의흥대왕)
Mother: Grand Princess Gyea of the Gyeongju Kim clan (계아태후 김씨)
Grandfather: King Heongang of Silla (? – 886) (신라 헌강왕)
Consorts and their Respective Issue:
Lady Jukbang of the Juksan Bak clan (죽방부인 박씨)
Crown Prince Maui (마의태자)
Kim Deok-ji, Duke of Beom (김덕지 범공)
Kim Myeong-jong, Duke Yeongbun (영분공)
Queen Heonsuk of the Gyeongju Kim clan (헌숙왕후 김씨)
Princess Nakrang of the Kaesong Wang clan (낙랑공주 왕씨)
Kim Eun-yeol, Prince Daean (김은열 대안군)
Kim Seok, Prince Uiseong (김석 의성군)
Kim Geon, Prince Gangreung (김건 강릉군)
Kim Seon, Prince Eonyang (김선 언양군)
Kim Chu, Prince Samcheok (김추 삼척군)
Unnamed princess
Lady Sinran of the Gyeongju Kim clan (신란궁부인 김씨)
Princess Wang of the Kaesong Wang clan (공주 왕씨) – No issue.

In popular culture
Portrayed by Shin Hwi-shik in the 2000–2002 KBS TV series Taejo Wang Geon.
Portrayed by Lee Do-ryun in the 2002–2003 KBS TV series The Dawn of the Empire.

See also
Gyeon Hwon
List of Korean monarchs
List of Silla people
Later Three Kingdoms of Korea

References

Silla rulers
Silla Buddhists
Goryeo Buddhists
Korean Buddhist monarchs
897 births
978 deaths
10th-century rulers in Asia
Year of birth unknown
Year of birth uncertain